Kafshgar Kola-ye Arateh (also Romanized as Kafshgar Kolā-ye Araţeh and Kafshgar Kolā-ye Arţeh; also known as Kafshgar Kolā) is a village in Bisheh Sar Rural District, in the Central District of Qaem Shahr County, Mazandaran Province, Iran. At the 2006 census, its population was 1,852, in 476 families.

References 

Populated places in Qaem Shahr County